Behind The Player: Stephen Perkins is an interactive music video of Jane's Addiction drummer, Stephen Perkins

Released on November 1, 2008, by IMV, the DVD has Perkins giving in-depth drum lessons on how to play, "Mountain Song" and "Been Caught Stealing" by Jane's Addiction and "Pets" by Porno for Pyros and an intimate behind-the-scenes look at his life as a professional musician. Perkins jams "Mountain Song" and "Been Caught Stealing" with the Slipknot bass guitarist Paul Gray, as well as other bonus material.

IMV donates $0.25 from the sale of each DVD to Little Kids Rock, an organization that provides instruments to underprivileged children.

Contents
Behind The Player
Perkins talks about his background, influences and gear, including rare photos and video

"Mountain Song" by Jane's Addiction
Lesson: Perkins gives an in-depth drum lesson for how to play the song
Jam: Perkins jams the track with the Slipknot bass guitarist Paul Gray

"Been Caught Stealing" by Jane's Addiction
Lesson: Perkins gives an in-depth drum lesson for how to play the song
Jam: Perkins jams the track with the Slipknot bass guitarist Gray

"Pets" by Porno for Pyros
Lesson: Perkins gives an in-depth drum lesson on how to play the song

Special features
Banyan Clips
Three Days Trailer
Little Kids Rock promotional video

Personnel

Produced by: Ken Mayer & Sean E Demott
Directed by: Leon Melas
Executive producer: Marc Reiser & Kim Jordan
Director of photography: William Murray
Sound engineer: Will Thompson
Edited by: Jeff Morose
Sound mix by: Matt Chidgey & Cedrick Courtois
Graphics by: Thayer Demay
Camera operators: Jimmy Alioto, Ben Booker, Jethro Rothe-Kushal
Gaffer: Ken Jenkins

Assistant director: Matt Pick
Production assistant: Laine Proctor
Lighting and grip: Mcnulty Nielson
Artist hospitality: Sasha Mayer
Shot at: The Chop Shop, Hollywood
Special guest: Paul Gray
Cover photo by: Alex Solca
Video courtesy of: Kevin Ford, Carter B. Smith, Three Days Llc, Rhino Records
Photos courtesy of: Neil Zlozower, Carter B. Smith, Dw Drums, Kevin Ford, The Chop Shop, Alex Solca

References

External links
Official website

Behind the Player